Aéroport  is the place of Gustaf III Airport, in quartier Saint-Jean of Saint Barthélemy in the Caribbean. It is located in the northern part of the island. As the name suggests, it contains the airport runway.

Populated places in Saint Barthélemy
Quartiers of Saint Barthélemy